Stefan Erkgärds (born March 23, 1985 in Hagfors, Sweden) is a Swedish professional ice hockey defenceman, currently with Rögle BK in the Swedish Elitserien.

Awards
 Elitserien Silver Medal in 2005.
 Swedish Champion with Färjestads BK in 2006.

Career statistics

Statistics as of April 29, 2008.

References

External links

1985 births
Bofors IK players
Färjestad BK players
Living people
People from Hagfors
Rögle BK players
Swedish ice hockey defencemen
Sportspeople from Värmland County